Petra Mandula (born 17 January 1978) is a Hungarian former professional tennis player, who represented her native country at the 2000 Summer Olympics in Sydney; in singles, she was eliminated in the first round by fourth seed Conchita Martínez of Spain, in doubles, she reached the quarterfinals, partnering Katalin Marosi. Four years later, when Athens hosted the Games, she once again was defeated in the first round, this time by Patty Schnyder of Switzerland.

She reached the quarterfinals at the 2001 French Open as a qualifier, winning seven straight matches and losing to eventual runner-up, Kim Clijsters. Two years later, at the 2003 French Open, she almost repeated the feat, losing in the fourth round 5–7 in the third set to Chanda Rubin. Also in 2003, Mandula reached the semifinals of the Australian Open with Emmanuelle Gagliardi, losing to Virginia Ruano Pascual and Paola Suárez.

WTA career finals

Doubles: 11 (7 titles, 4 runner-ups)

ITF finals

Singles: 13 (7–6)

Doubles: 12 (7–5)

Best Grand Slam results details

Singles

Doubles

Record against top 10 players
Mandula's record against players who have been ranked in the top 10:

Top 10 wins
Mandula has a  W–L record against players who were, at the time the match was played, ranked in the top 10.

References

External links
 
 

1978 births
Living people
Hopman Cup competitors
Hungarian female tennis players
Olympic tennis players of Hungary
Tennis players at the 2000 Summer Olympics
Tennis players at the 2004 Summer Olympics
Tennis players from Budapest